Hassan is a Yemeni football team currently playing in the Yemeni League, where they finished in 2nd place in the 2007 competition. It is based in Abyan.  Their home stadium is Al-Shohada'a Stadium.

References

Football clubs in Yemen